Sidi Ladjel is a town and commune in Djelfa Province, Algeria. According to the 1998 census it has a population of 11,776. The town lies on the N40 highway.

References

Communes of Djelfa Province